Pierre Mouillefert was a French botanist who specialized in dendrology, the study of trees. He was professor of silviculture at l'École nationale d'Agriculture de Grignon, and the present-day Arboretum de Grignon. His herbarium and some of his publications were lost in 1940.

References 

19th-century French botanists
1846 births
1903 deaths